Paul Gibbs (born 18 November 1971 in New Alresford) is a former English professional darts player who has played in the World Darts Federation tournaments.

Career
Gibbs his a long serving Hampshire County darts player, he has also qualified for the BDO World Championships in 2007, losing his first round game against Mervyn King, he has also reached the last 16 of the World Masters.

Gibbs quit the BDO in 2015.

World Championship Results

BDO 

 2007: 1st Round (lost to Mervyn King 0–3)

References

Paul Gibbs Player Profile

1971 births
People from Lowestoft
Living people
English carpenters
English darts players
British Darts Organisation players